The 1976 United States presidential election in Oregon took place on November 2, 1976, as part of the 1976 United States presidential election. Voters chose six representatives, or electors, to the Electoral College, who voted for president and vice president.
 
Oregon was won by incumbent President Gerald Ford (R–Michigan) with 47.78% of the popular vote, against Jimmy Carter (D–Georgia), with 47.62% of the popular vote, making this the closest state in the 1976 election. This was also  the closest presidential election in Oregon since its statehood in 1859. Oregon weighed in in this election as just over 2% more Republican than the nation-at-large. 

None of the third-party candidates amounted to a significant portion of the vote, but Eugene McCarthy (I–Minnesota) won 3.90% of the popular vote and came third overall in the nation. Despite losing in Oregon, Carter went on to win the national election and became the 39th president of the United States.

As of 2020, this is the last occasion when Crook County, Wheeler County and Linn County have voted for a Democratic presidential candidate. It was to end almost a century as a bellwether for Crook County, which was to become solidly Republican following the "Reagan Revolution". Clackamas County, which supported Ford, would not vote for a losing presidential nominee again until 2016. This was the last election in which Oregon would vote Republican in a close presidential election, as well as in which it would vote for a losing Republican, as of 2020. This Was Also The Last Time Oregon Voted To The Right of Texas.

Results

Results by county

See also
 United States presidential elections in Oregon

Notes

References

Oregon
1976
1976 Oregon elections